Nong Phok is a district (amphoe) in the northeastern part of Roi Et province, northeastern Thailand.

Geography
Neighboring districts are (from the south clockwise): Selaphum, Phon Thong, and Moei Wadi of Roi Et Province; Nong Sung of Mukdahan province; and Loeng Nok Tha and Kut Chum of Yasothon province.

History
The district history goes back to the small village Ban Nong Phok, which was part of tambon Kok Pho, Phon Thong district. It was made a minor district (king amphoe) on 16 June 1965, then consisting of the two tambons Kok Pho and Bueng Ngam. It was upgraded to a full district on 28 June 1973.

Places

Phra Maha Chedi Chai Mongkol on the premises of  Wat Pha Namthip Thep Prasit Vararam is one of the largest chedis in Thailand. It measures 101 metres wide, 101 metres long, and 101 metres high. The chedi is on 101 rai (16.16 hectares, very nearly 40 acres.) The number "101" symbolises the name of the province: roi-et is one hundred one in Thai numerals. The five-tiered chedi containing Buddha relics is decorated with elaborate designs in a contemporary style. The sides of the stairway leading into the central courtyard recall legendary origins in China and the subsequent adoption of Buddhism with multi-headed Nāgas emerging from the mouth of  Chinese dragons.
N 16° 19.932 E 104° 19.212 Waymark Code: WM95XK

Administration
The district is divided into nine sub-districts (tambons), which are further subdivided into 120 villages (mubans). Nong Phok is a township (thesaban tambon) which covers parts of tambons Nong Phok and Rop Mueang. There are a further nine tambon administrative organizations (TAO).

References

External links
amphoe.com (Thai)

Nong Phok